Elections to Comhairle nan Eilean Siar (Western Isles council) were held on 3 May 2007, the same day as the other Scottish local government elections and the Scottish Parliament general election. The election was the first one using 9 new wards created as a result of the Local Governance (Scotland) Act 2004, each ward elected three or four councillors using the single transferable vote system form of proportional representation. The new wards replaced 31 single-member wards which used the plurality (first past the post) system of election.

The large majority of the seats were held by independent candidates, similar to other predominantly rural Scottish councils.  The Scottish National Party and Scottish Labour Party had a small representation each, and the Scottish Liberal Democrats stood four candidates, all of whom were unsuccessful.

Election results

Ward results

Barraigh, Bhatarsaigh, Eirisgeigh agus Uibhist a Deas

Beinn na Foghla agus Uibhist a Tuath

Na Hearadh agus Ceann a Deas nan Loch

Sgir' Uige agus Ceann a Tuath nan Loch

Sgire an Rubha

Steòrnabhagh a Deas

Steòrnabhagh a Deas

Loch a Tuath

An Taobh Siar agus Nis

Changes since 2007 Election
†On 25 November 2011 John A. MacIver joined the Scottish National Party and ceased to be an Independent.

References

External links
 Council website

2007
2007 Scottish local elections